Holy Apostles' Church is a church in Hoshtevë, Gjirokastër County, Albania. It is a Cultural Monument of Albania.

References

Cultural Monuments of Albania
Buildings and structures in Libohovë